William Cavalheiro Ribeiro (born 7 January 1991) is a Brazilian footballer who is last known to have played as a midfielder, winger, or forward for São Paulo-RS.

Career

In 2017, Ribeiro signed for Brazilian fourth division side São Paulo-RS. In 2017, he signed for Brasil de Pelotas in the Brazilian second division, where he made 5 league appearances and scored 0 goals. On 12 August 2017, Ribeiro debuted for Brasil de Pelotas during a 1–0 win over Guarani (Brazil). Before the 2018 season, he signed for Brazilian third division club Ypiranga.

In 2020, he signed for Águia Negra in the Brazilian fourth division. In 2021, Ribeiro returned to Brazilian team São Paulo-RS.

Referee assault and attempted murder charges
Ribeiro was arrested for kicking referee Rodrigo Crivellaro unconscious in the middle of regular season game against Guarani-VA in Venâncio Aires, Rio Grande do Sul; which SP-RS lost 0–1. Ribeiro first punched Crivellaro in the face, and then kicked him in the head. Ribeiro was then charged with attempted murder by local authorities and was immediately released from the team, and was banned for 2 years by the Brazilian FA.
Nine months after kicking a referee in the head in a football match, former professional player William Ribeiro is said to have assaulted a judge again. On Sunday (24), during a game valid for an amateur 7-a-side football championship in Pelotas, he allegedly punched Jones Belém in the face, who was refereeing the match. The referee had a bruise under his right eye and filed a police report.

References

External links
 William Ribeiro at playmakerstats.com

Living people
Association football forwards
1991 births
Brazilian footballers
Association football wingers
Association football midfielders
People from Pelotas
Veranópolis Esporte Clube Recreativo e Cultural players
Ypiranga Futebol Clube players
Sport Club São Paulo players
Grêmio Esportivo Brasil players
Esporte Clube Águia Negra players
Sportspeople from Rio Grande do Sul